Boon Lay Secondary School (BLSS) is a government secondary school located in Jurong West, Singapore.

History 
The school commenced operations in 1977 at a S$3.59 million campus at the junction of Boon Lay Way and Jalan Boon Lay, with 13 classes, seven of which were English-medium and the remaining six Chinese-medium. It was officially opened in 1979 by the then-Member of parliament for Boon Lay Ngeow Pack Hua. It became a solely English-medium school in 1998, and started operating single-session in 2000.

In 1996 Boon Lay began enrolling deaf students. Specifically it educated deaf students who were required to use sign language to communicate. In 2017 the Government of Singapore designated Beatty Secondary School as the school to educate deaf students who must use sign language, concentrating all such students at one school due to them numbering about 15.

As part of the phasing-out of streaming, Boon Lay has been dividing classes by their students' co-curricular activities (CCA) since 2017.

Merger with Pioneer Secondary 
In 2017, Boon Lay Secondary School absorbed Pioneer Secondary School due to falling enrolment in both schools.

School identity and culture

Crest 
The current school crest was introduced in November 2016, in order to commemorate the merger of the school with Pioneer Secondary from then on. It depicts two people moving as one moving towards their goals, embodying a teacher and student working together. Its resemblance to a ladder also calls for its students to spur on to greater heights. The crest is accompanied by the acronym of the school and its Chinese name, the latter indicating the school's early years as a Chinese-medium school.

Notable alumni
Ken Chu: Member, Taiwanese boy band, F4

References

External links
Official site

Boon Lay
Secondary schools in Singapore